Lachung is a town and hill station in northeast Sikkim, India. It is located in the North Sikkim district near the border with Tibet. The word Lachung means "small pass".

The Indian Army has a forward base in the town. Before the Chinese occupation of Tibet in 1950, Lachung was a trading post between Sikkim and Tibet, after which it was closed down. The town's economy has been boosted by tourism in recent years as the region has been opened up by the Indian government. Tourists come from all over the world to visit the town between October and May, mostly on their way to the Yumthang Valley and the Lachung Monastery. Most of Lachung's inhabitants are of Lepcha and Tibetan descent. Languages spoken here are Nepali, Lepcha and Bhutia. During winter the town is usually covered in snow. Lachung is also the base camp for Rhododendron Valley Trek  which starts from Yumthang Valley and ends at Lachen Valley.

Lachung has been described as the "most picturesque village of Sikkim" by British explorer Joseph Dalton Hooker in his definitive, The Himalayan Journal (1855). Skiing is conducted in Phuni near this town.

Climate

Banking Facilities in Lachung

State Bank of India is operating a branch in Lachung.

State Bank Of India, Lachung

References 

Cities and towns in Mangan district
Ski areas and resorts in India